Richard Kwietniowski (born 17 March 1957) is an English film director and screenwriter of Polish descent. During the 1980s he was a film lecturer at Bulmershe College of Higher Education (now Bulmershe Court in Reading, Berkshire.  He has directed eleven films since 1987. His film Love and Death on Long Island was screened in the Un Certain Regard section at the 1997 Cannes Film Festival.

Filmography
 Alfalfa (1987)
 Ballad of Reading Gaol (1988)
 Flames of Passion (1989)
 Proust's Favorite Fantasy (1991)
 Cost of Love (1991)
 Actions Speak Louder Than Words (1992)
 Love and Death on Long Island (1997)
 A Night with Derek (1997)
 Owning Mahowny (2003)
 Regret Not Speaking (2003)
 No One Gets Off in This Town (2010)

References

External links

1957 births
Living people
English film directors
English screenwriters
English male screenwriters
English people of Polish descent
English LGBT people
Outstanding Debut by a British Writer, Director or Producer BAFTA Award winners
Writers from London